Susan Theresa Burke is an American writer, actress and stand-up comic. Born and raised in Casper, Wyoming, she now lives and works in Los Angeles, California. She is a frequent performer in the Los Angeles alternative comedy scene and has acted in film and television.

Burke is the co-writer of the 2012 film, Smashed, starring Mary Elizabeth Winstead and Aaron Paul. Burke co-wrote the film with director James Ponsoldt. The film is loosely based on Burke's own struggles with alcoholism and sobriety. Burke is open about getting sober at the age of 24, but most of her comedy and writing prior to Smashed has little to nothing to do with that, focusing instead on the absurdities of day-to-day life.

Burke was engaged to actor and comic Matt Peters in June 2012.

References

External links

Review of Smashed, Onion AV Club

American women comedians
Writers from Wyoming
Year of birth missing (living people)
Living people
21st-century American actresses
Comedians from Wyoming
People from Casper, Wyoming
Screenwriters from Wyoming
21st-century American comedians
21st-century American screenwriters